Golden International Airlines was a short-lived charter airline based in Istanbul, Turkey, operating flights on behalf of tour operators using Boeing 757 aircraft to destinations in Europe.

History
The airline was established in August 2005 and was owned by Alfa Bim, Bilgen Construction, Elsan and Yildiz Security.

Fleet
The Golden International Airlines fleet included the following aircraft:
2 Boeing 757-200

References

Defunct airlines of Turkey
Airlines established in 2005
Airlines disestablished in 2007
Defunct charter airlines of Turkey
2005 establishments in Turkey
2007 disestablishments in Turkey